Duncan J. Campbell (1845 – November 15, 1882) was a physician and political figure in Nova Scotia, Canada. He represented Inverness County in the Nova Scotia House of Assembly from 1872 to 1883 as a Conservative member.

He was born in Margaree Forks, Nova Scotia, the son of Samuel Campbell and Ann McDonald. Campbell was educated at Harvard College. He was first elected to the provincial assembly in an 1872 by-election held after S. McDonnell resigned his seat. In 1874, he married Elizabeth Smyth, the daughter of Peter Smyth, who had previously sat for Inverness in the provincial assembly. Campbell died in office at Port Hood.

His son Peter Smyth Campbell later served as Deputy Minister of Health for the province.

References 

1845 births
1882 deaths
Harvard College alumni
Progressive Conservative Association of Nova Scotia MLAs
People from Inverness County, Nova Scotia